The Roman Catholic church refers to Monaco as the Principality and Diocese of Monaco. Catholicism is the state religion and the majority religion of Monaco and the boundaries of the political principality are coterminous with that of the Catholic diocese. For further information, please see:

Catholic Church in Monaco
Roman Catholic Archdiocese of Monaco
Principality of Monaco